WCIC is a Christian adult contemporary music station in Peoria, Illinois. It is licensed to the nearby suburb of Pekin and owned by the University of Northwestern – St. Paul. Studios are located in northwest Peoria.

Repeaters
In addition to the main station at 91.5, WCIC simulcasts on full-power satellites WPRC 88.7 in Sheffield, Illinois (serving Sterling and Rock Falls), WSCT 90.5 in Springfield, Illinois and relays via an additional five translators. Between them, WCIC's network stretches across most of west-central Illinois.

Translators

Frequency areas
91.5 WCIC Pekin, Peoria, Havana, Canton, Washington, Bartonville, Lewistown, Morton, Dunlap, and Surrounding Areas.
90.5 WSCT Springfield, Lincoln, Petersburg, Taylorville, Rochester, Chatham, Athens, Auburn, Sherman, Pawnee, Oakford, Kinkaid, Mt. Pulaski and Surrounding Areas.
88.7 WPRC Sheffield, Sterling, Rock Falls, and Surrounding Areas.
90.3 W212AN & 91.7 W219DV Jacksonville, Waverly, Alexander, Browning, Mt.Steling, and Surrounding Areas.
98.9 W255AI Bloomington-Normal, LeRoy, Shirley, Heyworth, Towanda, Lexington, and Surrounding Areas.
100.5 W263AO Galesburg, Roseville, Knoxville, Williamsfield, East Galesburg, and Surrounding Areas.
97.3 K247BW Bettendorf, Davenport, Moline, East Moline, Rock Island, and Surrounding Areas.

New Life Media Network
WCIC and Champaign-based sister station WBGL are part of the Northwestern Media. Between them, the two stations and their satellites and repeaters cover almost two-thirds of Illinois, as well as portions of Missouri, Iowa, and Indiana.

On August 6, 2019, the Illinois Bible Institute reached an agreement to sell the entire WBGL/WCIC New Life Media Network to the University of Northwestern – St. Paul, which owns and operates a network of contemporary Christian stations and a network of Christian talk and teaching stations, for $9,901,558.34.

References

External links
 
 New Life Media network - sister station info

Assemblies of God
Contemporary Christian radio stations in the United States
CIC
Radio stations established in 1983
Companies based in Tazewell County, Illinois
1983 establishments in Illinois
Pentecostalism in the United States
Northwestern Media
CIC